Julio César Maya Cruz (born 19 September 1985) is a Cuban association football player who played as a forward for River Plate Puerto Rico in the USL Professional Division.

Club career
He was the top goal scorer for Sevilla FC in the 2009 Puerto Rico season with 22 goals.

External links
 https://web.archive.org/web/20090802044729/http://prsoccer.org/index.php?option=com_joomleague&func=showPlayer&p=4&pid=200&Itemid=26

References

1985 births
Living people
Sportspeople from Havana
Association football forwards
Cuban footballers
FC Ciudad de La Habana players
Cortuluá footballers
Sevilla FC Puerto Rico players
Miami FC (2006) players
C.D. Atlético Marte footballers
Club Atlético River Plate Puerto Rico players
Cuban expatriate footballers
Expatriate footballers in Colombia
Expatriate footballers in Puerto Rico
Expatriate footballers in El Salvador
Cuban expatriate sportspeople in Colombia
Cuban expatriate sportspeople in Puerto Rico
Cuban expatriate sportspeople in El Salvador
USL Championship players
Liga Nacional de Fútbol Profesional de Honduras players